Mountain Landscape with Castle is an oil on panel painting by Flemish painter Joos de Momper. The painting was probably completed in the 1600s.

Painting
The painting depicts the foreign, imaginary landscape typical of de Mompers' oeuvre and his circle. A warm colored and exotic foreground gives way to a less warm background with bluish highlands seen from a distance. Several people are traveling up and down a winding path dug into a cliff, on top of which there sits a castle. In the foreground, there moves a group of travelers with two donkeys. Among them there are two horsemen, one of whose horses stands beside a dog. In his early work, de Momper often collaborated with Jan Brueghel the Elder, who generally painted staffage figures for him.

Provenance of the painting
The painting became property of Arthur Seyss-Inquart, an Austrian Nazi leader responsible of crimes against the Dutchmen and humanity. The painting was acquired in 1942 by  Dr. Schubert-Soldern, and became part of Vienna's Gemäldegalerie collection in 1942.

References

External links
The painting at the Kunsthistorisches Museum official website
The painting at the Web Gallery of Art

16th-century paintings
17th-century paintings
Landscape paintings
Paintings by Joos de Momper
Paintings in Vienna
Paintings in Austria
Paintings in the collection of the Kunsthistorisches Museum